Karen Aline Peliçari (born 27 September 1989), simply known as Karen, is a Brazilian footballer who plays for Cruzeiro. Mainly a forward, she can also play as an attacking midfielder.

Club career
Born in Americana, São Paulo, Karen joined Santos from  ahead of the 2009 season. In January 2012, after the club's women's football section was closed, she moved to Centro Olímpico.

Karen subsequently represented Vitória das Tabocas, São Caetano and XV de Piracicaba before returning to Santos in 2015, as the women's team was reestablished. She left in 2019 to join Audax, and also played for Athletico Paranaense in 2020 before rejoining Peixe for a third spell in January 2021.

On 17 December 2021, Karen left Santos after her contract was not renewed.

International career
In 2008, Karen represented Brazil under-20s at the 2008 FIFA U-20 Women's World Cup. On 19 June 2013, she made her international debut with the full side, coming on as a late substitute for Giovânia in a 1–1 friendly draw against Sweden.

Career statistics

International

Honours
Santos
Copa Libertadores Femenina: 2009, 2010
Copa do Brasil de Futebol Feminino: 2009
Campeonato Brasileiro de Futebol Feminino Série A1: 2017
Campeonato Paulista de Futebol Feminino: 2018

References

1989 births
Living people
People from Americana, São Paulo
Brazilian women's footballers
Women's association football forwards
Campeonato Brasileiro de Futebol Feminino Série A1 players
Santos FC (women) players
Associação Desportiva Centro Olímpico players
Brazil women's international footballers
Footballers from São Paulo (state)